Naga-L, also called Naga-1, is a light carrier rocket under development by the China Academy of Launch Vehicle Technology (CALT). It is designed to compete on the international market for small-lift launch vehicles.

The project was unveiled on 14 October 2015 by Dr. Haoliang Yang during the 66th International Astronautical Congress in Jerusalem. A first launch was planned for 2017. In addition to its domestic Jiuquan Satellite Launch Center in the Gobi desert, CALT is considering potential launches of Naga-L from spaceports in Sweden (Esrange), Indonesia (Pameungpeuk) and Tanzania.

Due to ITAR restrictions imposed by the United States which limit the distribution of US manufactured components with military applications, China can't import US produced satellites to its own territory, which prevents their Long March rockets from competing in the worldwide commercial launch services market. Naga-L would bypass these constraints by exporting the rockets instead of importing the satellites.

Pricing would start at $10 million per mission.

References 

Space launch vehicles of China
Proposed space launch vehicles